Bolad (alternatively spelled Pulad, Pulat, Polat, or Polad in Persian and Turkic languages) is common given name among the Inner Asian peoples. The meaning of the word Bolad is "steel". In Khalkha Mongolian form of the word is Bold.

Bolad, the medieval Mongolian intellectual and representative of the Khagan in Iran
Pulad, Khan of the Golden Horde in the 15th century
Bold, Mongolian singer, producer and leader of Camerton (band)
Bars Bolud Jinong, Mongolian leader and prince in the 16th century

Mongolian given names
Turkish masculine given names